Kurt Schmid (11 February 1932 – 2 December 2000) was a Swiss rower who competed in the 1952 Summer Olympics and in the 1960 Summer Olympics.

Schmid was born in 1932 in Baar, Switzerland, the son of Olympic rower Karl Schmid. Schmid Jr. rowed in the coxless pair with his partner Hans Kalt. They won gold at the 1950 European Rowing Championships in Milan, and bronze at the 1951 European Rowing Championships in Mâcon. At the 1952 Summer Olympics, they won the bronze medal for Switzerland in the coxless pair event. Eight years later, in 1960, he participated as a crew member for the Swiss boat which finished sixth in the Olympic coxless four competition.

References 

1932 births
2000 deaths
Swiss male rowers
Olympic rowers of Switzerland
Olympic bronze medalists for Switzerland
Olympic medalists in rowing
Medalists at the 1952 Summer Olympics
Rowers at the 1952 Summer Olympics
Rowers at the 1960 Summer Olympics
People from Baar, Switzerland
Sportspeople from the canton of Zug
European Rowing Championships medalists